Teleantioquia is a Colombian regional public television channel, with headquarters in Medellín. Launched on August 11, 1985, it was the first regional channel in the country, initially only to cover the department of Antioquia. Subsequently, the channel expanded its emission capacity to neighboring Chocó. Its programming is general.

References

External links 
 

Television stations in Colombia
Spanish-language television stations
Television channels and stations established in 1985
1985 establishments in Colombia
Mass media in Medellín
Television networks in Colombia